Maleficent is a 2014 American fantasy film directed by Robert Stromberg from a screenplay by Linda Woolverton. The film stars Angelina Jolie as the title character, with Sharlto Copley, Elle Fanning, Sam Riley, Imelda Staunton, Juno Temple and Lesley Manville in supporting roles. Loosely inspired by Charles Perrault's original fairy tale, the film is a live action  retelling of Walt Disney's 1959 animated film Sleeping Beauty, and portrays the story from the perspective of the eponymous antagonist, depicting her conflicted relationship with the king and princess of a corrupt kingdom.

Walt Disney Pictures announced the film's development in 2010, with Joe Roth as producer and Jolie, Don Hahn, and Michael Vieira as executive producers. Principal photography took place between June and October 2012. A special screening for the film took place at Kensington Palace in London on May 9, 2014.

Maleficent premiered at the El Capitan Theatre in Hollywood on May 28, 2014, and was released in the United Kingdom that same day. The film was released in the United States on May 30, 2014, in the Disney Digital 3D, RealD 3D and IMAX 3D formats, as well as in conventional theaters. The film received mixed reviews, with critics praising Jolie’s performance, visual effects and costumes, while criticism was aimed at the script and inconsistencies in tone. Maleficent was a commercial success, grossing over $758 million worldwide, and became the fourth-highest-grossing film of 2014, as well as Jolie's highest-grossing film. The film received an Academy Award nomination for Best Costume Design at the 87th Academy Awards. A sequel, Maleficent: Mistress of Evil, was released in 2019.

Plot

Maleficent is a powerful fairy living in the Moors, a magical forest realm bordering a human kingdom. As a child, Maleficent meets and falls in love with a human peasant boy named Stefan. On Maleficent's 16th birthday, he gives her what he calls a true love's kiss. However, as they grow older, the two grow apart; Stefan's love is overshadowed by his ambition to be king, and Maleficent becomes protector of the Moors.

When King Henry tries to conquer the Moors, Maleficent mortally wounds him, forcing his retreat. As he lies dying, he declares that whoever kills Maleficent will be named his successor and marry his daughter. Stefan calls on Maleficent in the Moors; he drugs her, but cannot bring himself to kill her. Instead, he amputates her wings, presents them to Henry as 'proof' of Maleficent's death, and is named the new King. While still processing the betrayal, Maleficent turns Diaval, a trapped raven, into a human, frightening away his captors. Diaval promises to serve Maleficent, and  brings her news of the humans. Infuriated when she learns why her wings were taken, Maleficent, and the Moors she controls, become bitter and dark.

After some time, Diaval informs Maleficent that King Stefan's newborn daughter, Aurora, is being christened. Maleficent arrives uninvited and curses the infant princess; on her 16th birthday, she will prick her finger on the spindle of a spinning wheel and fall into an eternal sleep. Maleficent mocks Stefan's plea for mercy, but offers an antidote; the curse can be broken by true love's kiss, something she and Stefan both believe does not exist.

Stefan orders three pixie-fairies to hide and protect Aurora until the day after her 16th birthday, and  destroys every spinning wheel in the kingdom, hiding their remnants in the castle dungeon. Stefan sends his armies to find and kill Maleficent, but she surrounds the Moors with an impenetrable wall of thorns, protecting it. Over the years, Stefan obsesses over killing Maleficent and gradually loses his sanity, even refusing to see his own wife on her deathbed.

Maleficent and Diaval watch Aurora grow from afar, and secretly begin to take over Aurora's care from the bumbling and neglectful pixies. After encountering Maleficent face-to-face several times, Aurora names Maleficent "fairy godmother". Maleficent realizes she hasn't the heart to hurt Aurora, and privately attempts to revoke the curse, forgetting that she stated "no power on earth" can revoke it. Meanwhile, in the forest, Aurora meets a young Prince Phillip, and both are mildly attracted to each other.

On the day before Aurora's 16th birthday, Aurora gains Maleficent's permission to live in the Moors. When Aurora informs the Pixies of this, they reveal the truth about Aurora's lineage and the curse. Angrily accusing Maleficent of being evil, Aurora runs to her father's castle. Instead of welcoming Aurora, Stefan locks her in a room while plotting to kill Maleficent. The curse's power draws Aurora to the dungeon, where she pricks her finger on a spindle and falls into a deep sleep. Maleficent, intent on saving her, abducts Phillip and infiltrates Stefan's castle. The pixies encourage the reluctant Phillip to kiss Aurora, but this does not wake her. After Philip leaves, Maleficent tearfully apologizes to Aurora and kisses her on the forehead. This unexpectedly awakens Aurora, as Maleficent truly feels maternal love for her.

As Maleficent and Aurora attempt to leave, Stefan and his guards ambush them. Maleficent transforms Diaval into a dragon to help her, but both are subdued. Meanwhile, Aurora finds Maleficent's caged wings and releases them. They fly to Maleficent and reattach themselves, but Stefan continues fighting. Maleficent carries him to the top of the highest tower; unwilling to kill him, she announces the fight is over and tries to leave him there. He tackles her from behind, dragging them both off the tower. Maleficent opens her wings to save herself, causing Stefan to lose hold and fall to his death.

With King Stefan gone, Maleficent returns the Moors to its former glory, and gives away her position to Aurora, who is crowned queen of the Moors, uniting the two kingdoms. Phillip also comes to visit them.

Cast
 Angelina Jolie as Maleficent, a protector and the most powerful fairy of the Moors, who, in revenge for betrayal of her ex-lover Stefan, puts a curse on his daughter Aurora. As the film progresses, she turns from a hero into a villain, following Stefan's betrayal, and back into a hero because of the maternal feelings she develops towards Aurora. Jolie was announced to have been cast on February 11, 2012, although reports of her potential involvement in the project surfaced back in March 2010. She was considered for the role as early as when Tim Burton was attached to the project, and was always the only choice, with Joe Roth stating that the film would not have been made if she had refused. Jolie's interest in the role stemmed from her love for the character since she was little, as well as from the persuasions of her children and brother. She was also "very moved by the script", although she initially doubted the possibility of making a film about "someone who curses a baby". Jolie described her character as "slightly crazy, extremely vibrant, a little wicked and has a big sense of humor, so she's quite full on. It's one of those characters that, for me, you couldn't do halfway".
 Ella Purnell as teen Maleficent. Purnell was announced to have been cast on October 17, 2013. India Eisley was initially cast in the role in May 2012, but after it was decided to reshoot the opening scenes of the film, she was replaced by Purnell, who originally auditioned for the part of Aurora. Purnell's casting was personally approved by Jolie, although the two never met in person during the film's production. Anya Taylor-Joy also auditioned for the role.
 Isobelle Molloy as young Maleficent.
 Elle Fanning as Aurora, also known as Sleeping Beauty, a curious and cheerful daughter of Stefan and Leila, who becomes a victim of Maleficent's curse and a key figure in her finding a path to redemption. Fanning was announced to have been cast on May 7, 2012, with reports of her negotiations with the studio surfacing two months earlier. She was Roth's only choice for the part after he watched Super 8 (2011), where she starred. While preparing for the role, Fanning rewatched the original 1959 film to pick up mannerisms of animated Aurora, but she also tried to make sure that her version of the character would feel like a "real person, not just an animated character". According to Fanning, the hardest part of the role were the scenes where Aurora falls into her death-like sleep, since she had to remain completely still all the time while these scenes were filmed. Fanning described her character as "very free spirited, and since she has been kept away from normal life, she’s very open to things and innocent", while Robert Stromberg highlighted the "wonderful" contrast between Fanning and Jolie, calling Aurora the "beacon of light" that he enjoyed bringing together with the darkness of Maleficent.
Vivienne Jolie-Pitt as 5-year-old Aurora. Vivienne is Jolie's real-life daughter with Brad Pitt and was cast in the role as she was the only child on the film set who wasn't frightened of Jolie while in full costume as Maleficent. Before Vivienne's casting was approved, Jolie also offered the role to her other daughter, Shiloh, but she refused. Two other children of Jolie and Pitt, Pax and Zahara, make cameos in the christening scene.
Eleanor Worthington Cox as 8-year-old Aurora. Worthington Cox was announced to have been cast on October 4, 2012.
Janet McTeer as elderly Aurora, who serves as film's narrator.
Sharlto Copley as Stefan, a childhood friend and ex-lover of Maleficent, who cuts off her wings to become the king and eventually grows obsessed with killing her. Copley was announced to have been cast on May 7, 2012, while news of his negotiations with the studio surfaced a few days earlier. Jude Law was rumored to be considered for the role.
Michael Higgins as Young Stefan.
Jackson Bews as Teen Stefan.
Lesley Manville as Flittle, a blue pixie-fairy. Manville was announced to have been cast on May 7, 2012. Judi Dench and Emma Thompson were rumored to be considered for the role.
Imelda Staunton as Knotgrass, a red pixie-fairy. Staunton was announced to have been cast on May 7, 2012.
Juno Temple as Thistlewit, a green pixie-fairy. Temple was announced to have been cast on May 17, 2012.
Sam Riley as Diaval, a shapeshifting raven, who is saved by Maleficent and becomes her servant and confidant. Riley was announced to have been cast on May 7, 2012.
Brenton Thwaites as Phillip, a prince from a neighbouring kingdom of Ulstead who befriends and falls in love with Aurora. Thwaites was announced to have been cast on May 30, 2012.
Kenneth Cranham as King Henry, Stefan's predecessor, whose efforts to conquer the Moors get him slain by Maleficent. Cranham was announced to have been cast on May 7, 2012. Patrick Stewart was rumored to be considered for the role.
Hannah New as Princess Leila, King Henry's daughter, Stefan's wife and Aurora's mother.

Production

Development and writing
In 2003, during Don Hahn's meeting with Disney's animation department, it was suggested to create an origin film about Maleficent from Sleeping Beauty (1959) in the same vein as the just-released Broadway musical Wicked. The film was originally conceived as animated, but got cancelled two years into development, because, according to Hahn, it was "too difficult", so it was decided to go for a live-action approach instead. In late 2005, Hahn met with Tim Burton to pitch him several projects for Disney, including Maleficent, which Burton agreed to helm, but did not start working on it until around the summer of 2009, when he was finishing Alice in Wonderland (2010). Around the same time, Hahn approached Linda Woolverton, with whom he had previously worked on Beauty and the Beast (1991) and The Lion King (1994), to write the script, and in March 2010 she officially joined the project, while the studio began negotiations with Angelina Jolie to star as Maleficent. Burton personally supervised the development of the film for six months to a year, until in May 2011 it was announced that he had left the project due to his commitments to Frankenweenie (2012) and Dark Shadows (2012). Following Burton's departure, the studio considered David Yates, Darren Aronofsky, and David O. Russell to take over as director. Guillermo del Toro also expressed a desire to direct the film, citing Sleeping Beauty (1959) as one of his three favorite Disney films. In September 2011, Joe Roth joined the project as a producer, and in January 2012 it was announced that Robert Stromberg, the production designer of Avatar (2009), Alice in Wonderland (2010) and Oz the Great and Powerful (2013), would helm the project in his directional debut. A month later, during the 62nd Berlin International Film Festival, Jolie officially confirmed her involvement in the project.

Linda Woolverton's screenplay went through at least 15 versions as the film progressed in production. Stromberg said: "I met many times with Linda Woolverton, the writer. We did lots of roundtable discussions and sort of cut out the fat as much as we could and sort of purified the storyline as much as we could". Paul Dini also performed rewrites on the project with Stromberg, and was credited in early press. In some earlier versions of the story, Stefan was the half-human, half-fairy bastard son of King Henry. The version of the screenplay that went into shooting originally included two characters called Queen Ulla and King Kinloch, the fairy queen and fairy king of the Moors and the aunt and uncle of Maleficent. Miranda Richardson and Peter Capaldi were cast and shot the Queen Ulla and King Kinloch scenes, but their roles were cut in the editing process together with more than 15 minutes of the first act of the film. Stromberg said, "We spent a bit more time originally in the fairy world before we got into the human side of things ... we wanted to get it [the film] under two hours. So we cut about 15 minutes out of the first act, and then that had to be seamed together with some pretty basic reshoots." Woolverton also worked closely with Jolie, who wanted to make sure that Maleficent would remain villainous enough, without losing her "wicked sense of fun", while Woolverton leaned towards the more sympathetic side of the character, calling "keeping her both things: both the hero and the villain" the biggest challenge. 

Stromberg later claimed in an interview that he employed an "age-old" emotional storytelling for the film and called it "the biggest thrill" against all technology advances. "And the way we play with that is we have somebody who's perhaps in love but betrayed and doesn't believe that true love exists. So the moral to it is we can all feel dark ourselves but not to lose hope because there is light in places where we might not be expecting", he explained.

Principal photography
Principal photography began on June 13, 2012, at Pinewood Studios. Some filming took place in the Buckinghamshire countryside near Turville.

Reshoots
John Lee Hancock assisted Stromberg with reshoots for the film. Hancock, who had just finished overseeing the final postproduction stages of Saving Mr. Banks, was approached by producer Joe Roth, with whom he had worked on Snow White and the Huntsman. Roth said: "He's not directing. He wrote pages, and I hired a first-time director, and it's good to have him on set." Roth was asked why a "film of this magnitude was entrusted to a novice director", and he noted that Stromberg won Academy Awards for production design on Avatar and Alice in Wonderland. Roth said: "The movie is gorgeous to look at, and the last 75 minutes are really entertaining. The issue was the opening, which was reshot over eight days."

Visual effects
As a previous production designer, Stromberg sought to balance the use of practical and computer-generated effects. For example, while Maleficent's horns and facial prosthetics were created by makeup artist Rick Baker, Digital Domain took facial capture of Imelda Staunton, Lesley Manville, and Juno Temple for the three pixies to be generated with high authenticity with the help of special rigging by Disney Research in Zurich. For the visuals, Stromberg wanted to make it "a bit more grounded" and "not too surreal" because it could be distracting from the simplicity of the story. He also regretted not employing bigger sets and allowing actors to work in a more tangible environment, on "real sets with real lights".

Music

James Newton Howard was hired to score the film in October 2012. The film marked Howard's first live-action Disney film score, as he had previously scored three films from Walt Disney Animation Studios which include Dinosaur (2000), Atlantis: The Lost Empire (2001) and Treasure Planet (2002). On January 23, 2014, recording artist Lana Del Rey was announced as covering the song "Once Upon a Dream", from the 1959 film Sleeping Beauty, as the title song for Maleficent. The song "Once Upon a Dream" is based on the Grand Waltz from ballet Sleeping Beauty written by Russian composer Tchaikovsky. The single was released on January 26, 2014, during the 56th Grammy Awards and was made available for free for a limited time through Google Play. The soundtrack album, featuring Howard's score and Del Rey's cover of "Once Upon a Dream" was released on May 26, 2014, by Walt Disney Records.

Marketing 
On August 10, 2013, as part of the live-action motion-picture panel of the 2013 Disney D23 Expo in the Anaheim Convention Center at Anaheim, California, Disney unveiled its first look of Maleficent by revealing the new logo of the film's title and a one-minute clip from the film. Angelina Jolie made a surprise visit to the expo and talked with the attendees about her fascination with Disney's Sleeping Beauty as a child, her working experience with the filmmakers on the film, and her love of Disney. She also remarked on how she scared little girls when she was in costume, makeup, and acting during shooting; this led to the decision to hire her own daughter, Vivienne Jolie-Pitt, for the role of the young Princess Aurora, since she would not be scared of her own mother during principal photography.

Walt Disney Pictures released the teaser poster for Maleficent on November 12, 2013, featuring Jolie in costume and makeup, akin to the character's depiction in the original film. The first trailer was released the following day, on November 13. The first teaser trailer was attached to Thor: The Dark World, The Hunger Games: Catching Fire, Frozen, and Vampire Academy: Blood Sisters. Two more trailers were released in January 2014, revealing Maleficent's appearance. A third trailer featured Lana Del Rey singing "Once Upon a Dream". The final trailer was released on March 18, 2014.

Starting April 18, 2014, Disney's Hollywood Studios and Disney California Adventure previewed the film inside the ABC Sound Studio and It's Tough to Be a Bug! theaters, respectively. Disney Infinity 2.0 featured Maleficent as a playable figure using the look from the film.

Novelization
A tie-in novelization of the film written by Elizabeth Rudnick was published by Disney Publishing Worldwide on April 29, 2014.

Release
The film was originally slated for a March 14, 2014 release, before it was changed to July 2, 2014. On September 18, 2013, the film's release date was preponed to May 30, 2014, as Pixar's The Good Dinosaur faced production issues and delayed to 2015. In the United Kingdom, the film was released on May 28, 2014.

On November 22, 2018, a one-time special screening of the film is held in Sofia, Bulgaria at New Bulgarian University, where Bulgarian actor Peter Baykov does the dubbing for every character in the film by changing his voice from male to female live. He later performs part of the film trailer live during the semi-finals on the Got Talent show in Bulgaria in 2019 which leads him to the season finale. He later gets cast by Walt Disney Studios to play the role of Prince Phillip in Bulgarian for Maleficent: Mistress of Evil.

In September 2020, the film returned to theaters in the United Kingdom following their reopening from closure due to the COVID-19 pandemic.

Box office
Maleficent earned a gross of $241.4 million in the US and Canada, and $517.1 million in other countries, for a worldwide total of $758.5 million against a budget of $180 million. Calculating in all expenses, Deadline Hollywood estimated that the film made a profit of $190.77 million, making it the sixth most profitable film of 2014. Worldwide, in its opening weekend, the film earned $175.5 million, $9 million of which were from IMAX locations. It is also the biggest debut among films starring Angelina Jolie, and the actress' highest-grossing film of all time worldwide, as well as the fourth-highest grossing 2014 film (behind Transformers: Age of Extinction, The Hobbit: The Battle of the Five Armies, and Guardians of the Galaxy), and the 15th Disney-distributed film to surpass the $700 million mark at the worldwide box office. The film is also one of four Walt Disney Studios releases in 2014 to gross over $500 million; the other titles being Guardians of the Galaxy, Captain America: The Winter Soldier, and Big Hero 6.

In North America, Maleficent earned $4.2 million in Thursday-night showings, surpassing the midnight or late-night grosses of previous live-action fantasy films, Alice in Wonderland, Oz the Great and Powerful and Snow White and the Huntsman. By the end of its opening day (including late-night Thursday earnings), the film earned $24.3 million, similar to Oz, but ahead of Snow White and the Huntsman and behind Alice. Maleficent finished its debut weekend at first place with $69.4 million ($6.7 million of which was earned from IMAX locations and 35% of which was earned from 3D showings), which exceeded Disney's expectations of a $60 million opening and making it the largest opening-weekend performance for a live-action film starring Jolie (a record previously held by her 2008 film Wanted), as well as the third-highest opening weekend for a solo female star (behind the first two films in The Hunger Games series). Disney reported that 46% of ticket buyers in Thursday previews were male, while weekend reports said family audiences accounted for 45% of the film's total audience, and couples and teens accounted for 38% and 18%, respectively. Female audiences and moviegoers over 25 years old held respective proportions of 60% and 51%. Dave Hollis, head of Walt Disney Studios Motion Pictures, attributed this success to "some momentum and great word-of-mouth." During its first week, the film earned  $93.8 million, ahead of Snow White yet behind Oz and Alice. In its second weekend, Maleficent dropped by 50.6% to $34.3 million, finishing in second place. It experienced a smaller second-weekend drop than Snow White, yet still bigger than Oz and Alice. In North America, Maleficent is the eighth-highest-grossing 2014 film.

Maleficent opened outside North America on the same weekend as North America, earning $20.1 million from 35 territories in its first two days (May 28–29, 2014). During its opening weekend, the film topped the box office with $106.1 million from 47 territories. Its largest opening weekends were in China ($22.2 million), Mexico ($14.0 million), and Russia and the CIS ($13.0 million). On the second weekend of release, Maleficent fell to $61.7 million, earning from 52 markets. It was in first place at the box office outside North America on three weekends, its first, third ($39.2 million) and fourth ($47.9 million).

Maleficent is the fourth-highest grossing 2014 film, and Angelina Jolie's highest-grossing live-action film. In total earnings, the film's top markets after North America are Japan ($57.6 million), China ($47.7 million), Mexico ($46.2 million), Russia ($37.7 million), Brazil ($33.2 million), the United Kingdom ($31.7 million), Venezuela ($24.5 million), and Italy ($19.1 million). It was also the most watched film at the Maltese box office in 2014, enjoying an eighteen-week run.

Commercial analysis
Dave Lewis, writing for HitFix, predicted that although Disney fairy tales and Angelina Jolie's performance might attract audiences, Maleficent would not gross even as much as Oz the Great and Powerful, explaining that the film was released on the same time frame with competitive releases such as X-Men: Days of Future Past, Godzilla, and A Million Ways to Die in the West, though it outperformed those films later on. Boxoffice wrote that Maleficent had a successful marketing campaign, featured Jolie in the title role, and its "female-driven" themes and plot aimed at women. However, the site also noted that the film would have to compete with other summer releases, and the character of Maleficent may not attract young children. Todd Cunningham of The Wrap shared the same opinion, writing,  "[the film's] connecting with parents and that Jolie's considerable star power is having a big impact." Wells Fargo's Marci Ryvicker predicted that Maleficent might be "too dark and scary to be profitable" and was likely to force Disney "into a write-down", as reported by The New York Times; while RBC Capital Markets' David Bank commented that "It's definitely in the 'not a sure thing' bucket." Wall St. Cheat Sheet explained that the film approached to a more "grown-up" and "sinister" aspect of the classic, and targeted for an older audience like young adults. "It's just too scary for younger children," the site wrote. ScreenRant added that the PG rating of the film would "fill a void in the marketplace, which is currently without a traditional "family friendly" option." Box Office Mojo primarily compared the film with 2012's Snow White and the Huntsman (another film that also focused on a fairy tale villain), predicting that Maleficent "has a good chance" of matching Snow Whites gross in North America box office. The film, however, ended up grossing double the amount projected.

Variety wrote that the film's opening weekend outperforming initial box-office projections was later attributed by analysts in part to Disney's successful marketing to the "potent demographic" (female audiences) much like the studio accomplished with Frozen, in which both films feature a strong female lead. Disney argued that a lack of family-friendly options in the marketplace would "bode well for Maleficents [box-office] performance" in its two first weeks of release.

The cost of the film was offset by a rebate from the UK in the amount of £23,535,108 ($37 million in 2012, the period in which it was shot).

Home media
Maleficent was released by Walt Disney Studios Home Entertainment on Blu-ray, DVD, Blu-ray 3D, and digital download on November 4, 2014. The film topped the home-video sales chart in its first week of release. , Maleficent has made over $74 million in total home-video sales. Maleficent was released on 4K UHD Blu-ray on September 24, 2019.

Reception

Critical response
On Rotten Tomatoes, a review aggregator, the film holds an approval rating of 54% based on 273 reviews and an average rating of 5.70/10. The website's critical consensus reads: "Angelina Jolie's magnetic performance outshines Maleficents dazzling special effects; unfortunately, the movie around them fails to justify all that impressive effort." On Metacritic, the film has a weighted average score of 56 out of 100 based on 44 critics, indicating "mixed or average reviews". Audiences polled by CinemaScore gave the film an "A" grade on a scale of A+ to F. Jolie's performance in the film was repeatedly singled out for praise.

The New York Times stated, "with two shorn wings and an astonishing maternal kiss, Maleficent demolishes stereotypes that were only tweaked in Frozen." Kate Taylor of the Globe and Mail was very positive about the film, writing that "[it] surprises not for its baroque visions of a colourful woodland enlivened by joyous fairies and a forbidding castle peopled by unhappy humans, but rather for the thematic richness of its story gloriously personified by Angelina Jolie in the title role." While criticizing the overuse of CGI and 3D effects, she particularly praised the positive message of the film and Jolie's performance. She concluded her review with, "Long live the feminist revisionist backstory." On the contrary, Keith Staskiewicz, writing for the Entertainment Weekly, awarded the film a "B−" and wrote that "there's a lot of levitating cliffs and odd flora. But despite their bleeding-edge digital design, the backgrounds have all the depth of the old matte-painted backgrounds of the analog days," which made the film "[feel] classical in nature." He further commented that "The characters are boiled down to their essentials, the humor is timelessly broad." Michael Philips of the Chicago Tribune gave the film two and a half stars, commenting that the recent "formula" that "a new angle on a well-known fairy tale appears in the light" "works" with Maleficent. He also said that the film "is all about second thoughts" since Maleficent "spends much of the film as Aurora's conflicted fairy godmother." Phillips particularly praised Jolie and Elle Fanning's acting, Rick Baker's makeup (for Jolie's "angular, serrated look"), but criticized James Newton Howard's "sloshy, pushy" musical score. Robbie Collin of The Daily Telegraph wrote, "This Disney reimagining of Sleeping Beauty lacks true enchantment, but Angelina Jolie saves the day." Betsy Sharkey of the Los Angeles Times wrote, "This is Jolie's film because of the Maleficent she makes. Everyone else, even Aurora, fades in her presence." J.C. Maçek III of PopMatters wrote, "Even at its silliest, Maleficent is a well-acted film, with Sharlto Copley turning in a memorable performance and Elle Fanning proving to be an inspired choice for Aurora/Sleeping Beauty. Jolie manages to steal her own show in most every scene. Jolie is excellent as the hopeful fairy, enjoying the world she flies through. She is also brilliant as the Dark Lady, who could be a perfect counterpart to any Darth Vader, as she malevolently takes her revenge on those who have wronged her."

Ann Hornaday of The Washington Post awarded the film three-and-a-half out of four stars, commenting, "Still, for all its limitations, Maleficent manages to be improbably entertaining to watch, due solely to its title character." Writing for Roger Ebert's website, Matt Zoller Seitz awarded Maleficent three out of four stars, praising the themes of the film and the acting of Jolie. Seitz also called the scene in which Maleficent discovers the loss of her wings "the most traumatizing image I've seen in a Hollywood fairy tale since the Christ-like sacrifice of Aslan in 2005's The Chronicles of Narnia: The Lion, the Witch and the Wardrobe." The review in The Globe and Mail further explained that "in the simple context of a fairy tale, Jolie does make both the terrifying horned creature and her gradual awakening heartfelt," extolling the "emotional richness" behind her physical acts. Richard Roeper of the Chicago Sun-Times felt more negatively, assigning it a D. Although Roeper praised the visuals, he criticized the acting and writing, stating that "the story itself might well put you into the same type of coma that befalls the heroine."

Mary Costa, who voiced Aurora in the 1959 animated motion picture, called the film, "a very good movie". She added that "the concept and perspective are totally different than the original film's, which makes it new and interesting." As for Jolie's performance, she said, "No one could have played the part of Maleficent better," concluding that "she was absolutely magnificent!"

Rape allegory
Multiple reviewers and commentators have opined that an early scene in the movie, in which Stefan drugs Maleficent and removes her wings from her unconscious body, is a metaphor for rape. Hayley Krischer of The Huffington Post interpreted the scene as an important reference to rape culture: "This is the horrific side of rape culture. We're so enmeshed in it that it's impossible to ignore a metaphoric rape that occurs in a Disney movie". She went on to praise the film for giving a positive and hopeful message to rape victims, ultimately allowing "the woman to recover. It gives her agency. It gives her power. It allows her to reclaim the story". Monika Bartyzel of The Week noted the scene's implications in her review: "In its first act, Maleficent offers a dark, surprisingly adult exploration of rape and female mutilation".

However, Bartyzel went on to opine that the film portrayed Maleficent's actions as "a rape revenge fantasy" and criticized the film for not following through on its early subtext, ultimately calling it less feminist and reductive compared to its 1959 counterpart: "In Maleficent, Aurora is the product of a cold and loveless marriage and a vengeful, unhinged rapist. Her safety relies on a trio of clueless and dangerously careless fairies, and her Godmother is the woman who cursed her—and who had, in turn, been violated by her own father".

Angelina Jolie addressed the issue during an interview with BBC Radio 4 on the Woman's Hour programme and claimed that the subtext was intentional: "The question was asked: 'What could make a woman become so dark and lose all sense of her maternity, her womanhood, and her softness?' ... We were very conscious, the writer and I, that [the scene] was a metaphor for rape". She further explained that the answer to the question "What could bring her back?" was still "an extreme Disney, fun version [of the story]", but "at the core it is abuse, and how the abused then have a choice of abusing others or overcoming and remaining loving, open people".

Capitalism and socialism
Jordan Shapiro of Forbes argued that the film's main subtext was the detrimental effects of ultimata between capitalist and socialist societies. He pointed out that the Moors represented a socialist, nature-oriented, democratic society, while the human kingdom was one of capitalism, industry, and absolute monarchy. Shapiro further commented that the character of Stefan, his theft of the Moors' riches (the jewel), and his mutilation of Maleficent's wings for the sake of his ambition were references to the American Dream.

He conceived the wing-tearing scene as "a social commentary that any hierarchical rise to power inherently happens through the exploitation of others", explaining that it was the reason why "without her wings, Maleficent also becomes an oppressive ruler of the Moors. Everything she represents, believes, and stands for has been grounded", and "like most victims of oppression", "she takes it out on those who are smaller and weaker". He concluded that through the merge of the two kingdoms at the end of the film, it sought to weave together capitalism and socialism and let go oppositions: "It is time to leave the kingdom of familiar partisan oppositions: let's replace either/or with neither/nor or both/and".

Awards and nominations

Sequel

On June 3, 2014, Angelina Jolie hinted about the possibility of a sequel. On June 15, 2015, Disney announced the sequel with Linda Woolverton returning to write the screenplay and Joe Roth to produce the film. On April 26, 2016, it was confirmed that Jolie would reprise her role as Maleficent. On August 30, 2017, Disney hired screenwriter Jez Butterworth to rewrite the initial script by Woolverton. On October 3, 2017, it was reported that Joachim Rønning (Pirates of the Caribbean: Dead Men Tell No Tales) is in talks on directing the sequel.

In January 2018,  the sequel was reported to start filming in spring 2018, and that Patrick Tatopoulos had joined the crew as production designer. In April 2018, Ed Skrein was announced to play the film's villain, and that Elle Fanning was set to reprise her role as Aurora.

On April 27, 2018, it was reported that Michelle Pfeiffer was in advanced talks to play a queen in the sequel, while the script's most recent draft was written by Noah Harpster and Micah Fitzerman-Blue. On May 2, 2018, it was reported that Harris Dickinson had joined the cast as Prince Phillip, replacing Brenton Thwaites, who was unable to reprise the role due to scheduling conflicts. On May 4, 2018, it was announced that Chiwetel Ejiofor (who previously worked with Jolie in Salt), was in talks to join the cast of the sequel as a potential love interest to Maleficent. On May 17, 2018, Jenn Murray was announced to join the cast.

On May 23, 2018, David Gyasi was reported as joining the cast in an unspecified role. On May 29, the movie officially started filming as the cast and synopsis were revealed.

Principal photography concluded on August 24, 2018. The film was released on October 18, 2019.

References

External links

 
 
 
 
 
 
 
 

2014 films
2014 3D films
2010s fantasy adventure films
American 3D films
American fantasy adventure films
American sword and sorcery films
Live-action films based on Disney's animated films
American fantasy drama films
2010s feminist films
Films scored by James Newton Howard
Films about atonement
Films about curses
Films about dragons
Films about fairies and sprites
Films about princesses
American films about revenge
Remakes of American films
Films about royalty
Films about shapeshifting
Films based on adaptations
Films based on multiple works
Films based on Sleeping Beauty
Films set in castles
Films set in country houses
Films set in the 14th century
Films set in the Middle Ages
Films shot at Pinewood Studios
Films shot in England
Films produced by Joe Roth
IMAX films
Films using motion capture
Sleeping Beauty (1959 film)
Films with screenplays by Linda Woolverton
Walt Disney Pictures films
2014 directorial debut films
Maleficent (franchise)
2010s English-language films
2010s American films